Richfield is a city in Hennepin County, Minnesota. An inner-ring suburb of Minneapolis, Richfield is bordered by Minneapolis to the north, Minneapolis–Saint Paul International Airport and Fort Snelling to the east, Bloomington to the south, and Edina to the west. The population was 36,994 at the 2020 census.

Best Buy, the U.S.'s largest electronics retailer, is headquartered in Richfield.

History

In the 1820s, some small settlements developed around Fort Snelling. By the late 1830s, the fortress served as a destination for newcomers—lumbermen, missionaries, farmers, traders and travelers—migrating to the borderlands people were now calling "Minisota". Minnesotan Franklin Steele reached the area in 1837 and worked as a sutler, selling goods to soldiers.

Fort Snelling's garrison made up the bulk of the area's population, along with Henry Sibley and Alexander Faribault's 75-person American Fur Company operation. Other small settlements of traders, farmers, missionaries and refugees began to develop outside the fort, some with permission, some without. These residents built communities on land that became known as Richfield.

Minnesota's oldest suburb claim
Richfield was one of the earliest postwar suburbs in the Twin Cities to be populated by veterans returning from World War II, but its claim to be Minnesota's oldest suburb date to the land's connection to Fort Snelling in the 1820s. The term "suburb" is from the Latin suburbium, "the land outside a walled city". Much of the land that comprised the Township of Richfield and today's City of Richfield included the Fort Snelling military reservation, which included Camp Coldwater.

Richfield Township is established

One of the first settlers to the area was Riley Bartholomew, a former general in the Ohio Militia. He later became a Richfield justice of the peace and a Minnesota state senator. Bartholomew built a house on Wood Lake's eastern shore in 1852, and the restored Riley Lucas Bartholomew House is listed on the National Register of Historic Places. Today, the Richfield Historical Society maintains the house and the site.

The Harmony post office, south of the Richland Mill on Lyndale Avenue, opened in 1854. Postmaster James Dunsmoor named the mail center after his hometown in Maine. Richfield farmers looked on the metropolis to its north as their marketing target. They helped supply its restaurants, hotels, grocers and citizens with fresh produce, with enough left over to ship by railroad to other cities.

On May 11, 1858, Congress approved the Territory of Minnesota as the 32nd state to join the union. That day, local citizens met in a schoolhouse at present-day 53rd and Lyndale to form a municipal government. At that meeting, those who previously said they lived in Harmony or Richland Mills chose the name Richfield for their community.

Settlers from Maine made up 35% of U.S.-born adults 18 or older in 1860 Richfield. New York immigrants were 21%. Immigrants from Ireland, numbering 58, represented half of the 119 adults from other nations. Just three of Richfield's citizens had been born in Minnesota.

Richfield's fields proved bountiful for the settlers. Early crops included corn, wheat and oats. Wheat immediately became the cash crop, sold in the area's first major market, St. Paul. Those in southern Hennepin County found it more profitable to haul their wheat crop to St. Paul than to the St. Anthony Falls district. This was before "King Wheat" and Minneapolis's evolution into a milling center.

Market gardening
Minneapolis became a favorite trading point for market gardeners in 1897 with the building of the modern, covered Second Street Market just two blocks west of Hennepin Avenue and Bridge Square. The market featured a massive platform for gardeners, including Richfield's sizable contingent, to unload and display produce. The new system freed streets from traffic snarls by allowing each person to unhitch and put up their horses, while their wagon was backed into an assigned space. Wholesale customers could then bring their teams to the platform and negotiate prices when the starting bell sounded.

Boundary changes
Today's boundaries differ markedly from those the Hennepin County Board of Commissioners set forth on April 10, 1858, when it established the towns of Richfield, Minneapolis, Bloomington and Eden Prairie. Richfield's boundaries included about 63 square miles. Richfield originally ranged to Minneapolis's Lake Street on the north, to what is now Highway 169 on the west, to Bloomington on the south, and to Fort Snelling and the Minnesota and Mississippi rivers on the east.

Parts of Richfield were later lost to neighboring towns or villages through annexation. An 1886 partition of Richfield created the village of St. Louis Park, and a division in 1889 produced the village of Edina. Minneapolis absorbed sizeable portions of Richfield through legislative action or annexations in 1867, 1883, 1887 and 1927. The growth of Minneapolis-Saint Paul International Airport during the last half of the 20th century and additions of land to the Fort Snelling compound meant further reductions.

20th century

In 1908, Richfield became a village. From 1908 until 1950, Richfield's local government consisted of a president, three trustees, and a city clerk. On November 7, 1950, residents voted for a city-manager form of government, meaning the city had a mayor, four council members, and a city manager. This is still Richfield's form of government. The first mayor was Clarence Christian, who began serving in 1951, but served as president under the old format dating back to 1948. By the late 1940s, the city's population started increasing rapidly as farmland was sold to developers building homes for veterans returning from World War II. The Richfield Chamber of Commerce was formed in 1955 and has been deeply involved in the community's development and redevelopment.

Over the years, populations of all nearby communities increased and after World War II, Richfield flourished with commuters to Twin Cities jobs. As of 2019, Richfield has a population of about 35,000, who live within seven square miles of neighborhoods, parks, and shops.

Geography

Interstates 35W and 494 and Minnesota State Highways 62 and 77 are four of the main routes in the city. Other main routes include 66th Street.

The majority of the 10,000 single-family homes were constructed in the 1950s, and the 5,000 apartments date from the 1960s and early 1970s. The Richfield Rediscovered Housing Program has established an environment of change in the community as it encourages home remodeling, expansion, and reconstruction. The program is gradually changing the face of Richfield's residential neighborhoods, upgrading them from small, post-WWII styles to larger homes.

Economy

Business

Best Buy Company, Inc. moved its corporate headquarters to Richfield in 2003, becoming its largest employer.

From the first quarter of 2001 to the first quarter of 2003, net job growth equaled 2,444 – the second highest in the metropolitan area. Additionally, total employment in Richfield jumped from 10,090 to nearly 15,000 between 1995 and 2005.

In 2007, Cedar Point Commons opened in Richfield at Cedar Avenue and 66th Street, adjacent to Minneapolis–Saint Paul International Airport. Target and The Home Depot serve as its anchor tenants.

Top employers
According to the City's 2014 Comprehensive Annual Financial Report, the top employers in the city are:

Education
Richfield has public schools, private schools, alternative education programs, and post-secondary options.

Public schools
The local school district, Richfield Public Schools (officially Independent School District #280), serves about 4,200 students in Richfield and part of Edina in grades K-12. Richfield schools are divided into elementary schools, middle schools, and high schools.

Four elementary schools serve primary students in grades K-5: Centennial Elementary; Sheridan Elementary; R-STEM Elementary, which focuses its curriculum on science, technology, engineering, and math; and RDLS Elementary, a dual language school that teaches students in both English and Spanish.

Students in grades 6-8 attend Richfield Middle School. Richfield High School serves approximately 1400 students in grades 9-12.

The South Education Center is in the 7400 block of South Penn Avenue. It serves pre-K through "Transition" age.

In addition to Richfield Public Schools, public charter schools also serve residents, including Seven Hills Preparatory Academy and Watershed High School.

Private schools
 Academy of Holy Angels, a Catholic, co-educational high school that serves over 800 students in grades 9-12
 Blessed Trinity Catholic School

Post-secondary
Adler Graduate School
Minnesota Life College

Recreation
Wood Lake Nature Center is a  park operated by the city that features wetlands, walking paths and an interpretive center. When the Nature Center opened in 1971, it was one of the nation's first urban nature centers. It is home to more than 200 different kinds of birds and 30 mammals.

Richfield's Ice Arena has two full-size indoor skating rinks. Hockey games, figure skating, broom ball games, open skating, and community events all take place there. Near the ice arena is Richfield's outdoor pool. Renovated in 2003, it features a 50-meter competitive pool, wading pool, and a  double waterslide.

2017-2019 brought a major overhaul of 66th street to improve the look of the city and increase recreation opportunities, with new, dedicated bike and walking lanes for pedestrians.

Demographics

2020 census

Note: the US Census treats Hispanic/Latino as an ethnic category. This table excludes Latinos from the racial categories and assigns them to a separate category. Hispanics/Latinos can be of any race.

2010 census
As of the census of 2010, there were 35,228 people, 14,818 households, and 8,420 families living in the city. The racial makeup of the city was 69.8% White, 9.2% African American, 0.8% Native American, 6.1% Asian, 0.1% Pacific Islander, 10.4% from other races, and 3.5% from two or more races. Hispanic or Latino of any race were 18.3% of the population.

There were 14,818 households, of which 26.7% had children under the age of 18 living with them, 41.2% were married couples living together, 10.8% had a female householder with no husband present, 4.9% had a male householder with no wife present, and 43.2% were non-families. 34.3% of all households were made up of individuals, and 12.9% had someone living alone who was 65 years of age or older. The average household size was 2.35 and the average family size was 3.05.

The median age in the city was 36.2 years. 21.3% of residents were under the age of 18; 8.5% were between the ages of 18 and 24; 31.4% were from 25 to 44; 24.7% were from 45 to 64; and 14.2% were 65 years of age or older. The gender makeup of the city was 49.2% male and 50.8% female.

2000 census
As of the census of 2000, there were 34,439 people, 15,073 households, and 8,727 families living in the city. The racial makeup of the city was 81.25% White, 6.65% African American, 0.72% Native American, 5.30% Asian, 0.04% Pacific Islander, 3.41% from other races, and 2.64% from two or more races. Hispanic or Latino of any race was 6.27% of the population.

There were 15,073 households, out of which 24.4% had children under the age of 18 living with them, 43.4% were married couples living together, 10.5% had a female householder with no husband present, and 42.1% were non-families. 33.7% of all households were made up of individuals, and 12.0% had someone living alone who was 65 years of age or older. The average household size was 2.25 and the average family size was 2.89.

In the city, the population was spread out, with 20.2% under the age of 18, 9.3% from 18 to 24, 33.4% from 25 to 44, 20.7% from 45 to 64, and 16.4% who were 65 years of age or older. The median age was 37 years. For every 100 females, there were 96.2 males. For every 100 females age 18 and over, there were 93.0 males.

The median income for a household in the city was $45,519, and the median income for a family was $56,434. Males had a median income of $38,417 versus $29,909 for females. The per capita income for the city was $24,709. About 3.9% of families and 6.3% of the population were below the poverty line, including 8.3% of those under age 18 and 3.8% of those age 65 or over.

Politics
Richfield's mayor is Mary Supple, a retired Richfield Public School teacher.  

Former Richfield Mayor Maria Regan Gonzalez was the first Latina mayor in Minnesota history. Regan Gonzalez was a councilwoman in Ward 3 before being elected in 2018.

Richfield has five city council members: Sharon Christensen (Council At-Large), Simon Trautmann (Council Ward One), Sean Hayford Oleary (Council Ward Two), Ben Whalen (Council Ward Three), and Supple. At the state level, Richfield is represented State Senator Melissa Halvorson Wiklund and State Representative Michael Howard. The city is in Minnesota's 5th congressional district, represented by Ilhan Omar.

Notable people
 Steve Christoff – member of the 1980 USA men's hockey team that won the gold medal in the Miracle on Ice
 Larry Fitzgerald – football player
 Donald F. Gleason – American physician and pathologist
 Darby Hendrickson – former NHL player
 Shirley A. Hokanson – Minnesota state legislator and social worker
 William G. Kirchner – Minnesota state legislator and banker
 Richard Kruger – CEO of Imperial Oil, former vice president of ExxonMobil
 Charles W. Lindberg – U.S. Marine
 Bill Mack – sculptor, artist
 Damian Rhodes – hockey player
 Chad Smith – Red Hot Chili Peppers drummer
 Will Steger – Arctic explorer and environmentalist
 Christopher Tjornhom – Minnesota state legislator

Notes

References

Further reading

External links

City website
Richfield Historical Society

 
Cities in Minnesota
Cities in Hennepin County, Minnesota
Populated places established in 1908
1908 establishments in Minnesota
Histories of cities in Minnesota